8000 Plus (renamed PCW Plus early in 1992) was a monthly British magazine dedicated to the Amstrad PCW range of microcomputers. It was one of the earliest magazines from Future plc, and ran for just over ten years, the first issue being dated October 1986 and the last (as PCW Plus) being issue 124, dated Christmas 1996.

Science fiction writer David Langford wrote a regular column for 8000/PCW Plus, which ran (albeit not continuously) for the magazine's entire lifespan.

References

External links
8000 Plus Magazine, Magazine Collection at the Internet Archive

1986 establishments in the United Kingdom
1996 disestablishments in the United Kingdom
Amstrad magazines
Defunct computer magazines published in the United Kingdom
Home computer magazines
Magazines established in 1986
Magazines disestablished in 1996
Mass media in Somerset
Monthly magazines published in the United Kingdom